Ksenia Pervak was the defending champion, but did not compete in the juniors this year.

Karolína Plíšková won the tournament, defeating Laura Robson in the final, 6–1, 7–6(7–5).

Seeds

Draw

Finals

Top half

Section 1

Section 2

Bottom half

Section 3

Section 4

External links
 Main draw

Girls' Singles
Australian Open, 2010 Girls' Singles